Antti Niemi may refer to:

Antti Niemi (footballer) (born 1972), Finnish football goalkeeper
Antti Niemi (ice hockey) (born 1983), Finnish ice hockey goaltender
Antti-Jussi Niemi (born 1977), Finnish ice hockey defenceman